This list of Auburn High School people includes graduates, former students, administrators, trustees, faculty, and staff of Auburn High School in Auburn, Alabama.  The list includes people affiliated with the school's predecessor institutions, the Auburn Female College (1843–1852, 1870–1885), the Auburn Masonic Female College (1852–1870), the Auburn Female Institute (1892–1908), and Lee County High School (1914–1956).

Auburn High School is the oldest public high school in Alabama, and the third-oldest operating secondary school in the United States south of Philadelphia. As of 2010, the school enrolls 1,309 students in technical, academic, and International Baccalaureate programs as well as joint enrollment with Auburn University and Southern Union State Community College.

The first graduation exercises of Auburn High School were held in the 1840s, awarding fewer than a dozen diplomas at each session.  Today the school awards over three hundred diplomas a year and has graduated more than ten thousand students. This list organizes those associated with Auburn High School into rough professional areas and lists them in order of graduating class or years of affiliation with the school.

Professional area

Art, literature, and music

Journalism

Military

Politics and government

Science, mathematics and technology

Social sciences

Sports

Other people

Principals and presidents

Fictional characters

References and notes

List of Auburn High School people
 
Auburn High School
Auburn High School